Mae Chan Subdistrict is a tambon (sub-district) of Mae Chan District, in Chiang Rai Province, Thailand. In 2013 it had a population of 10,835.

Administration
The sub-district is divided into 14 administrative villages (mubans).

As the local government, the sub-district municipality Mae Chan Municipality covers about 2 km2 of the most urban parts of the sub-district along Phahonyothin Road, whereas the sub-district administrative organization (TAO) Mae Chan Sub-district Administrative Organization covers the remaining area of the sub-district.

References

External links
thaitambon.com (Thai)
Website of Mae Chan municipality (Thai)
Website of Mae Chan TAO (Thai)

Tambon of Chiang Rai province
Populated places in Chiang Rai province